Patraikos Football Club was a Greek football club based in Patras, Greece. Its colours were green and white.

History
Patraikos Football Club was a club of Patras, which was active in football. They were founded in 1993 as A.O. Panathinaikos Skagiopouleiou from friends of Panathinaikos in the city and with Stathis Moutzouroulias as president. They belonged to the force of FCA Achaea, had the colors green-white and emblem the clover. Initially, they used the stadium of Ladopoulos as its headquarters. 

In four years they achieved two ascents and in 1999 they won the championship of A' Category of FCA Achaea. In 2000, they were renamed Patraikos A.O., maintaining the same appearance, but with a new brand, the lighthouse - a symbol of Patras - and competing in the Prosfygika Stadium (Refugee Stadium). Successive promotions led to participation until the Beta Ethniki, and after three years in the category (2001–2004) they absorbed their compatriot Panachaiki. The purpose was to write off her serious financial debts, so the two clubs founded as the Panachaiki Gymnastics Company 2005 by amending the statutes of Patraikos.

Honours

Leagues 
Gamma Ethniki (Third National Division)
 Winners (1): 2000–01
Delta Ethniki (Fourth National Division)
 Winners (1): 1999–2000
FCA Achaea Championship (Local Championship)
 Winners (1): 1998–99 (as Panathinaikos Skagiopouleiou)
FCA Achaea Cup (Local Cup)
 Winners (1): 1999–2000

References

External links
 FCA Achaea official website

Defunct football clubs in Greece
Association football clubs established in 1993
1993 establishments in Greece
Gamma Ethniki clubs
Football clubs in Western Greece